The Royal Palace of Kandy is a historical palace complex located in the city of Kandy, Sri Lanka, and was the official residence of the kings of the Kingdom of Kandy before the British colonisation in 1815. The palace complex is a remarkable example of traditional Kandyan architecture, adorned with intricate wood and stone carvings, and murals on the walls. It comprises several buildings, including the Audience Hall, the Queen's Palace, the King's Palace, and the famous Temple of the Tooth Relic. The Temple of the Tooth, one of the most revered Buddhist temples in the world, is also located within the palace complex. The palace complex and the Temple of the Tooth are both designated as UNESCO World Heritage Sites.

The city of Kandy was built in a stunning pattern of twelve cycles by the kings of Kandy, showcasing their grandeur and architectural prowess. However, after the fall of the kingdom to British invaders, the once glorious landscape was cruelly altered beyond recognition.

History
The history of the Royal Palace of Kandy spans several centuries and involves multiple kings and rulers. The first palace was constructed in the 14th century by Vickramabahu III. Later, it was occupied by Vimaladharmasuriya I in the late 16th century, who made various improvements to the existing palace. During the reign of Senarat in the early 17th century, the palace was destroyed by Portuguese invaders. However, it was later rebuilt by Rajasinha II in 1634.

Location and architecture
The location of the palace has changed over time. The first palace was situated on the opposite side of the current location. During the reign of King Vimaladharmasuriya I, the palace was heavily influenced by Portuguese architecture. The Portuguese foreign accounts provide a detailed description of the palace complex, which is very different from the current remaining structures.

Invasions and destruction
The Royal Palace of Kandy faced several invasions and was destroyed multiple times. Many buildings were destroyed, and only several buildings remain today. However, the kings of the Kandyan Kingdom rebuilt the palace over time, each time adding their unique style to the complex.

Evolution

After 1760, the location of the palace changed from the west to the east. The palace complex underwent significant changes during the reign of King Sri Vikrama Rajasinha. The palace included several buildings, including the Queens' Palace, the Hall of Audience, and the Temple of the Tooth. The palace complex also had several officials and attendants who served the king and the royal family, dressed in colorful robes and turbans.

Following the Kandyan Convention in 1815, the Royal Palace was used by the British Resident starting with Sir John D'Oyly and thereafter the Government Agent in Kandy until 1947. The British Governor of Ceylon would reside in the palace when visiting Kandy until the construction of the King's Pavilion.

Wahalkadas
The three wahalkadas, or main gateways were the main entrances to the Kandyan palace. It is believed that the oldest section of the palace was the one facing the Natha Devale.

Maha Wahalkada (Main Gate)
Uda Wahalkada (Upper Gate)
Pitathi Wahalkada (Outer Gate)
Mohana Wahalkada
Madhura Wahalkada
Kora Wahalkada

Maha Wahalkada
As one enters the moonstone, they are greeted with a flight of seven steps leading up to the grand Mahawahalkada or the main gate. Following the architectural tradition of Kandy, the entrance to the religious premises is designed with an arch-shaped door. The structure is not only spacious enough to accommodate doorkeepers, but it is also roofed and adorned with three pinnacles at the top. The wall surrounding the gate is heavily thickened, adding to its strength and grandeur.

Main Buildings

Maha Wasala

The King's Palace, also known as the Maha Wasala or Raja Wasala, is located at the northern end of the palace complex, to the right of the Magul Maduwa. This two-storey building features a central doorway and a flight of steps leading to an impressive hall adorned with stucco and terra-cotta work. The building has long wings on either side containing rooms, as well as a verandah facing the inner courtyard. 
The King's Palace was used by the Government Agent Sir John D'Oyly during the early British period, and his successors continued to use it as their official residence. The building is currently being utilised as a museum by the Department of Archaeology. One of the unique features of this building is the "Siv Maduru Kawulu," from these observation windows the King can view in all directions to see the Queen's Palace, Temple of the tooth, the city and Udawatta Kele Sanctuary (Uda Wasala Watta) at the same time through the Maha Wasala.

Maha Maluwa

Maha Maluwa, also known as the Great Terrace or Grand Esplanade, is an open park area in front of Temple of the Tooth in Kandy, Sri Lanka. The area has great historical significance as it was once the location where the sacred tooth relic was placed. It also served as the waiting area for those seeking an audience with the king in the past. The grandeur of the Maligawa structure can be seen by devotees from this area.
According to local folklore, astrologers advised Vimaladharmasuriya I to select the site of the threshing floor, which was frequented by a Kiri Mugatiya (white mongoose), as the site for his capital.

At one end of the square is a stone pillar memorial that contains the skull of Keppetipola Disawe, a national Sinhalese hero and a prominent leader of the Uva rebellion of 1818. Keppetipola Disawe attempted to wrest back the country from the British and was executed for his role in the rebellion. The park also contains a statue of Madduma Bandara and a statue of Princess Hemamali and Prince Danthakumara, who according to legend, brought the tooth of Buddha to Sri Lanka.

Magul Maduwa

The Magul Maduwa, also known as the Audience Hall or Hall of Ceremony, was a significant structure in the Kandyan period. It was built by Sri Rajadhi Rajasinha in 1783 AD and was used as a place for public audience and carrying out daily administrative tasks by the king. The area also served as a center for religious and national festivities related to the Kandyan Court. The building now has two rows of elegantly carved pillars, each row with 32 columns, supporting a Kandyan-style roof. It was at the Magul Maduwa that the King received ambassadors from other countries, and where the ill-famous Kandy treaty was signed on 2 March 1815, marking the end of the Kingdom of Kandy, the last native kingdom of the island.

Maha Naduwa 

The Maha Naduwa or Great Court, was where the foremost constituted judicial body in the Kandyan kingdom was held. Its building changed according to the situation, and at times it was located in the Magul Maduwa, the audience hall. When the kingdom fell, a separate building was designated for it, which was partially constructed in 1815 but was destroyed by the British invaders.

Only the king ranked higher than the Maha Naduwa in matters of justice, and it could not exceed the jurisdiction of the Adikaramwaru. The Maha Naduwa consisted of all the principal chiefs, Adikaramwaru, Dissawas, and Muhandirams. The court heard cases referred to it by the king or cases directly brought before it.

Wadahindina Mandappe

This is the palace where the king used to rest while adigars and other visitors awaiting for him. Foreign visitors were able to meet the king in this palace. It is situated near the Raja wasala and Magul maduwa. Today this building is used as Raja tuskera museum.

Inside the Rajah Tusker Hall are the stuffed remains of Rajah, the Maligawa or chief elephant in the Kandy Esala Perahera, who died in 1988. The building is just north of the Temple of the Tooth but within the same compound.

Meda Wasala

The Meda Wasala, also known as the Queens' Chambers, is located to the north of the Palle Vahale, which was used as quarters for the royal concubines and is similar in architectural design. It consists of a small open courtyard with verandahs and a single bedroom, constructed of valuable timber with a bed placed on four stone understructures. The entrance to the middle hall is made of large logs, and the door lid is small, attached to the tile with wooden hinges. The building is designed to be locked only from the inside, and the corridor near the courtyard carries frescoes, a unique feature for a residence.

Many features of Kandy era architecture can be seen in the Meda Wasala, including wooden pillars with carvings, piyassa with pebbles, a central courtyard with padma boradam, and a drain system built around it. According to historical records of the Kandy era, King Sri Vikrama Rajasingha secluded Queen Rangammal in this building, and only her closest servants had the chance to see her. Despite its size, the Meda Wasala has only one room, and four copper sheets in the archaeological museum are believed to have been used as a protective spell buried in pits in the four pillars of the bed. These mantras were likely used for the protection of sexual affairs. Some flower patterns drawn on a red background have also been found under the plaster on the surface of the wall.

Palle Vahale

The Palle Vahale, also known as the Lower Palace, is a historical building constructed during the Sri Vickrama Rajasingha era. It was primarily used as the quarters for the king's royal concubines, known as Ridi dolis and Yakada dolis. The main doorway leads to a small hall in front of the central building, flanked on either side by two wings. Inner verandahs on all four sides face an inner central courtyard. The windows are made of wooden poles with cracks, and legend has it that King Kirti Sri Rajasingha first resided in this building. In 1942, the building was converted into the National Museum of Kandy and is currently maintained by Department of National Museums.

Hathapenage
The Hathapanage is a building located in the royal palace complex. The Hathapanage Appuhamy's were the servants who worked under this building for the king's service. The Hathapanage served as the bed chamber for the king and also contained the king's bathing chambers, known as Ulpange().

The Hathapanage Appuhamy's served under officers named Muhandiram Nilame of the Maha Hathapenage, the secretary, and Kankanama. Twelve guards were assigned to hold a stabbing equipment called Illukkole. The garment included a red piece of cloth called Paccawadam that covered the mouth, while the rest of the cloth was white.

Ran Ayuda Mandapaya

The Ran Avuda Mandapaya, constructed in 1592 by King Wimaladharmasuriya I, was where the crowns and swords of Kandyan kings were designed, molded, and adorned. This building was among the first to be added to the Royal Palace Complex. Located beyond the Meda Wasala is the Royal Armoury or Ran Ayuda Maduwa, featuring a central porch supported by timber columns.

Atapattu Murapola
The Atapattu Murapola, or Royal Time Keepers Point, was also known as the Water Clock Gate. Earlier they were 50 to 60 in number but the last Sinhala King brought it down to 48. Putting the water clock plates in position and accompany the King while touring was one of their duties. The Atapattu Maduwa was a building place close to the Royal Palace. Those serving here placed four water clock plates in the pond and to inform the time, they rang a bell. They had divided the daytime into parts and the night into four Jamas or Phases in such a manner.

Wedasitina Maligawa 
The Wedahitina Maligawa, also known as the Tooth Relic Chamber, is the third room in the Uda Male or Upper Chamber where the sacred Tooth Relic is kept. In the king's era, this was a highly guarded space because it kept the Tooth of Lord Buddha, which symbolised the power of the kingdom at that time. The entrance to the chamber is adorned with silver plaques depicting the symbols of the sun and the moon. The Tooth Relic is kept enclosed within seven golden caskets, each studded with precious gems. The outermost casket is partially covered with valuable jewelry offered by past kings and dignitaries. The Perahera Karanduwa, or the casket used during the procession of the Esala Perahera festival, is kept next to the Tooth Relic casket. Monks from the Maha Viharas of Malwatta and Asgiriya take turns performing daily rituals on a half-yearly basis. During these rituals, the drummers beat the drums from the Hewisi Mandapaya located below. The Vedahitina Maligawa is a highly revered and sacred space, visited by devotees from all around the world.

Pavilions

Paththirippuwa

The Paththirippuwa, also known as the Octagonal Pavilion, is a magnificent architectural structure located at the entrance of the Kandy Maligawa(Palace) in Sri Lanka. Built-in 1812 during the reign of King Sri Wickrama Rajasinghe, the pavilion was designed by the talented local architect Devendra Moolachary. Originally constructed as a separate structure from the main Maligawa complex, it was later incorporated into the complex. The name "Paththirippuwa" is derived from Tamil, meaning "to sit and see something", and reflects its purpose as a location for the king to address the people, watch perahera, sword fights, and wrestling competitions. The pavilion was also used as a District Secretariat during the British colonial era and later converted into a library. Devendra Moolachary, who designed this pavilion, was honored by King Sri Wickrama Rajasinghe with a Nalal Patiya, a head ornament made of gold embedded with gems, which is considered the highest honour a king can offer. The octagon-shaped roof, outer pillars, and perimeter wall of the Paththirippuwa are unique presentations of local architectural traditions.

Jayathilaka Mandapaya 

Jayathilaka Mandapaya,, Royal Summer House, also known as Kunda Hall, is a small building located in the middle of Nuwara Lake in Sri Lanka. This beautiful island was created by King Sri Wickrama Rajasinghe, who built a dam across the lake to reach the opposite side. The soil was removed from both the palace end and the Malwatte Vihare end, leaving an island behind.

Initially, this island was used as the Royal Summer House for the Queen and the ladies of the court to relax. However, during the British colonial era, it was used as an ammunition store and a fortress-style parapet was added around its perimeter. The island is accessible by a retractable suspension bridge, known as "Halwela,"(හල්වැල- හකුලන පාලම) which was built to reach the island when needed.

In the middle of the island stands Jayathilaka Mandapaya or Kunda Hall, a small building that adds to the island's charm. While the island has no ruins today, it is still a popular tourist destination due to its history and serene surroundings.

Ulpange

The Ulpange, also known as the Queen's Bathing Pavilion, is a historic building located on the embankment of Kandy Lake, south of the Temple of the Tooth in Kandy, Sri Lanka. It was constructed in 1806 by King Sri Wickrama Rajasinha as the bathing chamber for his queens, including Queen Venkatha Ranga Jammal (Rengammal) and her companions.

The two-storey building is bounded by the lake on three sides. The upper floor served as the changing room, while the ground floor was used for bathing. The arches supported by columns allow sun and light to enter the lake at the ground level.

It is constructed with molded stone slabs, with a stone deck running around the pool area. There is a half-circle-shaped opening visible in the stone pool structure to take the excess water of the bathing pool outside, which maintains a certain water level in the pool.

The name "Ulpange" derives from the words "Ul" for "Spring," "Pan" for "Water," and "Ge" for "House," denoting "Structure of Spring Water." The pool's water source is believed to have been a natural spring, which maintained a constant supply of fresh water for the pool.

A high-roofed square pavilion is erected just before the bathing pool, which was likely used as a waiting area for the queens visiting the Ulpange. The Queen's Bathing Pavilion was open to the sky in 1817, with several columns erected on the pool deck area. These columns may have been meant for a roof structure to cover the bathing pool water area or for an already existing roof.

The British made changes to the original stone pool deck during their administration and converted the pool area into a floor area. They utilised the building as a library from 1828, called the "United Service Library."

Although we are used to seeing the Queen's Bathing Pavilion situated in Kandy Lake's water, in reality, the Ulpange was constructed six years before the lake was constructed and filled. So, there was no lake but the Tigol Wela paddy field with a marshy land on which the Queen's pool was constructed. The water source for the Bathing Pool came from a water sprout of a natural spring surfacing beneath the pool area, which had been surrounded by cemented stone slabs to construct the bathing pool basin and raise the water level of the oblong octagonal-shaped pool we see today.

Other buildings

The palace complex is believed to have originally contained 18 buildings, but 12 of them were fully destroyed by the British colonial invaders after the fall of the kingdom. Many of the remaining buildings were also modified by the invaders. Here is a list of some of the buildings that were either fully destroyed or modified by the invaders:

Deva Sanhinda
Beth Ge
Wa Eliye Maduwa
Dakina Shalawa
Kawikara Maduwa
Dakina Mandapaya
Haramakkara Maduwa
Muddara Mandapaya
Santhi Maduwa
Maha Gabada Aramudala/Aramudale
Uda Gabadawa
Demala Ilangan
Madhura Maduwa

Other Structures

Diyareli Bamma and Walakulu Bamma 
The roadway running in between the Temple of the Tooth and the King's Palace and the Natha Devale temple is not being used as a road now. In the past, it served as the access road to both the King's Palace and the Tooth Relic Temple. A thick short wall referred to as "Diyareli Bamma," which means "Wave Swell Wall," runs along the border between the Tooth relic temple and the road. This wall features a triangular shape, and throughout its width, there are triangular cavities used to place lighted oil lamps. A moat exists between the Wave Swell Wall and another wall built at a higher elevation on the front side of the Temple of the Tooth Relic. This latter wall, known as "Walakulu Bamma" or "Cloud Swell Wall," has a curved design and can be found in many temple paintings of the Kandyan era. The Royal architect Devendra Mulachari was responsible for its architecture.

Diya Agala 

In the area between the elephant statues flanking the moonstone and the Mahawahalkada lies a narrow, open strip surrounded by a short perimeter wall. This area is protected by a moat that serves as a defensive measure for the Royal Palace Complex. The moat emerges from the foundation of the Pattirippu, an octagonal-shaped building, and surrounds the structure. Originally fed by the nearby Kandy Lake during the time of the kings. The moat extended up to the temple of Vishnu. The architecture of this structure was designed by Devendra Mulachari, who served as the royal architect under several kings.

Ambarawa 

The entrance to Ambarawa, a tunnel-shaped hallway, is accessed through a stone-made dragon-arch. A painting of eight men, dressed in traditional Kandyan costume, is depicted inside the hall, making their way to pay homage to the sacred tooth relic in the palace premises. The roof of Ambarawa is adorned with a lotus flower design from the Kandyan era. The painting evokes a sense of respect and serenity for the visitor.

Moonstone entrance

Located at the base of the Wahalkada, where the entrance to the Maligawa(Palace) is situated, is a triangular artifact that is part of the Kandyan tradition. On either side of the two statues, a dragon emerges, with a beautiful creeper growing out of each one. In the center, there is an upward protracting lotus seat. It is worth noting that the Perahera is not permitted to enter onto the moon-stone until the Diyawadana Nilame has arrived.

Dragon arch

When entering through the Mahawahalkada, visitors are expected to pass through a stone Dragon-arch, with statues of doorkeepers on either side. The head of the dragon statue is adorned with decorative creepers. It is beautifully sculpted with stone creepers, petta, and lotus flowers.

Four holy devales
There were four devalas, or shrines of gods, within the palace premises, which were reserved for the use of the king and palace officials. Each of these devalas played a vital role in the daily routines of the king. Today, these devalas are open to devotees from all around the country, as there is no longer a king to whom they are exclusive.

Natha Devalaya

The Nàtha Devàla, located on the terrace in front of the Royal Palace complex in Kandy, is a sacred shrine with a long and fascinating history. Its origins can be traced back to a time before the arrival of the Tooth Relic in Kandy. Built in the 14th century by King Vikramabahu III, it is the oldest surviving structure in the city. The worship of God Natha has an ambiguous history, as the name 'Natha' means 'no form' and 'no shape' and is often associated with Maitreya, the future Buddha.

During the time of the Kandyan Kingdom, the Natha Devàla played a vital role in the establishment of the monarchy. This shrine was used for the coronation of kings, who would receive their royal names during the ceremony. On the coronation day, a clay pot containing the names of the kings would be kept in the inner palace of Natha Devalaya. After performing the morning rituals, the king's name was chosen from the pot. A separate mandapa (Abisheka Mandapaya) within the temple grounds was used for crowning the king, and the foundation of this pavilion can still be seen today near the Devalaya.

The temple itself is a beautiful structure made entirely of stone, following the South Indian Pallava tradition of gedige houses. Next to the Natha temple, a Gambhara temple can also be found. This temple features wall paintings by the Dutch, who painted them during their stay in the area until they received an invitation from the king to meet with him. The paintings depict sailing ships and are still visible today.

Vishnu Devalaya
The Vishnu Devale of Kandy is a shrine situated in the inner complex of the palace, located to the north of the Natha Devale. It is devoted to God Vishnu, one of the Hindu Triad, who is considered a solemn deity that was committed to safeguarding Buddhism from the beginning. He is revered as the god who protects Sri Lanka, and in doing so, he also protects Buddhism.
In the past, this shrine played a significant role in the coronation of the new king, where the sword was bestowed upon him.

Pattini Devalaya
The Pattini Devale, which is dedicated to the goddess Pattini, is located to the west of the Natha Devale in the palace premises. Previously, the two shrines were separated by a crossroad called "Et Vidiya" or Elephant Street, which is no longer in existence. The exact history of the Pattini Devale is not known, but it is believed to be at least four centuries old, as Robert Knox referenced the perahera of Pattini Devale during the reign of King Rajasinghe II (1635-1687).

Katharagama Devalaya
According to legend, after King Sri Vira Parakrama Narendrasinghe married a South Indian princess, he constructed this shrine specifically for her to worship God, Skanda Kumara. The shrine is located opposite the royal palace premises and is the only devala located outside of the palace grounds. The devalaya was situated near the original royal palace, which was located on the opposite side of the current royal palace, before 1760.
The entrance to the shrine is through an arch-shaped Wahalkada that is decorated with a Makara thorana. Above the Wahalkada is a small square-shaped structure made of wooden pillars, which adds to its organised and well-designed appearance.

Lakes
There were two man-made lakes located near the royal palace premises. One of these was Bogambara Lake, which no longer exists today. The other is Kandy Lake, which is also known as the Milk Sea.

Bogambara lake
Bogambara Lake, also known as the Bogambara Tank, was a man-made lake located near the Royal Palace premises in the city of Kandy, Sri Lanka. According to historical records, the lake was built during the reign of the first King of Kandy, Wimaladharmasuriya (1592-1604 AD), who also built the iconic Dalada Palace.

However, some other sources claim that the lake was constructed during the reign of King Rajasingha II (1636-1687 AD) as one of the 32 tanks mentioned in the historical poem, Mandarampura Puvata. The water for the lake was sourced from the Dunumadala Oya and streams flowing down the nearby mountains, including Dunumadala, Hantana, Bhairava, Udawatta Kale, and Ampitiya.
At its prime, Bogambara Old Lake was massive, and the Dalada Palace, located nearby, would have looked magnificent from a distance. The lake's boundaries extended from the Kandy bus station, the clock tower, the public market, the Kandy education department, the main post office, the railway station, and the Kandy police building to the Ganadevi Temple. Even today, springs emerge from the ground in areas where buildings stand on top of the lake's former boundaries.

The lake was also used for various purposes, including crocodile breeding and as a site for drowning Ahelepola Kumarihami and other women by King Sri Vikrama Rajasinghe, who tied stones around their necks. Robert Knox, in his book on Sri Lanka, also mentions the lake's association with crocodile breeding.

Today, the old Bogambara Lake is no longer visible, and there are several theories about how it disappeared. The construction of the Colombo-Kandy road in 1841 involved filling a part of the lake, while the Colombo-Kandy railway project, which was completed in 1867, reclaimed another portion of the lake.
The final blow to the old lake came when Prince Edward VII of Great Britain visited Kandy in 1875. The authorities chose to reclaim the entire lake, and the Bogambara Playground now stands in its place.

Kandy lake 

Kandy Lake, also known as Kiri-muhuda, is a man-made lake located in front of the Temple of the Tooth in Kandy, Sri Lanka. It was built by King Sri Wickrama Rajasinha in 1807 by converting the former paddy fields known as Tigolwela. The lake's design is credited to Deveda Moolacharya.
The king first constructed a dam across the paddy fields, starting from the Paththirippuwa side and stretching across to the Poya-maluwa. A roadway was also built on the dam, allowing the king to travel to the Malwatte Vihare. The dam's construction is believed to have taken place between 1810 and 1812.
The lake features a small artificial island at its centre, which is surrounded by various legends and folklore. One local legend suggests that the island was used by the king's harem for bathing and was connected to the palace by a secret tunnel.

Royal Parks and Forest Reserves
The Kingdom of Kandy was home to two parks for the royals: Peradeniya Royal Garden, now known as Peradeniya Royal Botanical Garden, and Rajawasala Park, the Royal Palace Park of Kandy. In addition, there was a forest reserved by the royals known as Udawatta Kale or Udawattakele. This forest was considered forbidden by the locals during the royal era.

Peradeniya Royal Garden

Peradeniya Royal Garden is a garden located near the Mahaweli River in Sri Lanka. Its origins date back to 1371 when King Wickramabahu III established his court in Peradeniya. Subsequent kings, including Kirti Sri and Rajadhi Rajasinghe, also held court in the area. In 1821, Alexandar Moon began using the land for growing coffee and cinnamon plants. The garden was formally established in 1843, with plants brought from Kew Garden, Slave Island, Colombo, and Kalutara Garden.

During World War II, the garden was used by Lord Louis Mountbatten, the supreme commander of the allied forces in South Asia, as the headquarters of the South East Asia Command. The Cannonball Tree, planted by King George V of the United Kingdom and Queen Mary in 1901, is a notable item in the garden. It is often laden with fruit that resembles cannonballs.

The garden was also featured in the 1957 film, The Bridge on the River Kwai. Despite its early beginnings, the garden came under the administration of the Department of Agriculture only in 1912.

Rajawasala Park

The Royal Palace Park also referred to as Wales Park, Wace Park, or Rajawasala Park is a small park situated on a hilltop in the center of Kandy city. It provides a scenic view of Kandy Lake and most of the city. King Sri Vikrama Rajasinha of Sri Lanka established the park, but it was renamed Wales Park in honor of the Prince of Wales by the British.
During the British colonial period, the hill where the park is currently located was known as Castle Hill. It was the site of the palace of Konappu Bandara, Vimaladharmasuriya I of Kandy, who ruled from 1590 to 1604. However, it was neglected over time until Herbert Wace, CMG (1851–1906), the Government Agent of the Central Province and acting Colonial Secretary, restored the site and established the park in 1880.

Uda Wasala Watta

The forest area behind the palace was called "Uda wasala watta" or the 'Upper Palace Garden' during the Kandyan Kingdom and was frequented by royalty, out of bounds to the public. The forest was once a rainforest, and human settlements began during the reign of King Panditha Parakramabahu (1302-1326 AD) in the 14th century. In 1371 AD, King Wickramabahu made Kandy his Kingdom and during this era, Kandy was called "Senkadagala." A Brahmin named Senkanda, who lived in a cave at Udawattakele during that era, gave rise to the name. The forest reserve is a vital bio-reserve for the much-populated city, and the catchment areas of the forest supply the water resources of Kandy Lake. The forest also supplies much-needed air purification to the city, which is enclosed by several hills.

Ancient Paintings in the Palace Complex

The Royal Palace Complex of Kandy is a treasure trove of art, with a diverse range of paintings adorning its walls, ceilings, and woodwork. These paintings, however, cannot be attributed to a single period, as the palace underwent repairs and renovations over time. Thus, one can observe differences in style and technique in the paintings.

The subjects of the paintings are equally diverse, featuring Buddha, and Jataka stories, gods and goddesses, kings, and animals. The oldest murals of the Kandy era are found in the inner palace of Dalada Maliga, with mural paintings in Kandy starting during the reign of King Keerthi Sri Rajasingha (1747-1786). The palace houses paintings of the king, Wimaladharmasuriya, who built the Dalada Palace of Kandy First, and King Keerthi Sri Rajasingha, who maintained the temple of the tooth. For example, the image of King Wimaladharmasuriya holding a flower in his right hand and a stick in his left is painted on the ceiling on the right side of the main entrance to the palace.

One can also find paintings of King Keerthi Sri Rajasingha on the left side of the entrance to the palace, as well as on the left wall of the Pallemala shrine for Lord Buddha. Two other paintings belonging to the story of Vessantara are located on the top of the wall and the floor on the left side of the palace of the tooth. Moreover, paintings of ordinary people, including elites carrying chamars, flags, and flowers, can be seen in many places in the palace complex.
Over the years, many ancient paintings may have been lost or buried due to the palace's various renovations. For instance, it was discovered that there were paintings in Meda Wasala, which had flower patterns on red backgrounds on the inner walls. Unfortunately, the paintings in the Maha Wasala inner walls were severely damaged due to years of neglect. After the terrorist attack in 1998, a picture of an elephant was plastered in the palace of the tooth, suggesting that there may be more paintings from that era waiting to be discovered.

In conclusion, the Royal Palace complex of Kandy boasts a rich collection of paintings that offer a glimpse into the palace's history and the artistic styles of different periods.

Events
After the fall of the Kandyan Kingdom and the abolition of the position of the King of Kandy, the responsibility for overseeing the festivals held in the Kandy royal palace premises fell under the guidance of the Diyawadana Nilame of the Temple of the Tooth. These festivals include the New Harvest Festival in January (Duruthu), the New Year Festival in April (Bak), the Esala Perahera Festival in July or August (Esala or Nikini), and the Karthika Festival in November.

The Temple of the Tooth, which is located within the palace complex, initiates these festivals. In the royal era, these festivals were overseen by His Majesty the King, and some events were founded by the Kings of Kandy during various eras. These festivals are important cultural and religious events that showcase the rich heritage of Sri Lanka and attract visitors from all around the world.
With the guidance of the Diyawadana Nilame, these festivals continue to be celebrated grandly and traditionally, with various rituals and ceremonies that honor the Sacred Tooth Relic and pay tribute to the country's cultural legacy.

Festival of New Rice (New Harvest Festival)

The Festival of New Rice, also known as the New Harvest Festival, takes place in January, marking the final festival of the year according to the Sinhala calendar. The highlight of this festival is the offering of milk rice, made from the first harvest of paddy to the Sacred Tooth Relic. In the past, the King was responsible for officiating this ceremony and overseeing the measurement and distribution of the rice. However, today this duty falls upon the lay custodian of the Sacred Tooth Relic, known as the Diyawadana Nilame.
During the festival, 80 Serus (an ancient traditional measurement) of milk rice is offered to the Sacred Tooth Relic on the Duruthu Full Moon Poya day. The Diyawadana Nilame distributes the remaining rice to 91 temples and Devalas, with the rest being distributed according to the 2nd and 3rd lists. The festival is steeped in tradition and serves as a reminder of the importance of agriculture and the connection between the land and the people.

New Year Festival (Aluth Avurudu)

The New Year Festival, celebrated in April, marks the beginning of a festive month and is the first major festival of the year according to the Sinhala calendar. During this festival, the Mohottala, an Officer responsible for overseeing the auspicious times and rituals, prepares for the temple and other Devalas.

In the past, the King was responsible for officiating this ceremony, but today, the offering of Pooja to the Sacred Tooth Relic is a daily ritual overseen by the temple authorities. However, during the New Year Festival, special attention is paid to observing auspicious times and rituals, with five main activities taking place.

These include the Dawn of the New Year holy bath, the boiling of milk, the preparation of food items, and the oil anointing ceremony, which is held at the Natha Devala on the Wednesday following the New Year day. The aim of these activities is to bring abundance and prosperity to the country and its people.

Kandy Esala Perahara Festival

The Esala Perahera is the second annual festival of the Temple of the Sacred Tooth Relic, held within the palace premises. It is considered to be one of the most historic and culturally significant events in the world. The festival is a vibrant and colorful celebration, with a procession that features a majestic elephant carrying the Sacred Tooth Relic and various other traditional performers, including dancers, drummers, and fire dancers. The festival is a proud testament to Sri Lanka's rich cultural heritage and attracts thousands of visitors from all around the world.

Karthika Festival

The Karthika festival, which is the third festival of the Temple of the Sacred Tooth Relic, takes place in November. This festival features a magnificent parade, or Perahera, which is followed by the offering of lighted oil lamps to the Sacred Tooth Relic after nightfall. The festival is believed to have been influenced by the Dipawali Festival of Hindu culture and was introduced to Sri Lanka by the South Indian Nayakkar kings.

The Diyawadana Nilame is responsible for organising this festival, which has been celebrated for centuries. In ancient times, the King himself distributed oil for the Karthika festival. Today, the Sri Dalada Maligawa provides oil to the four main Devalas and other listed rural temples and Devalas. The oil is then distributed by Kariyakaravana Korala, following the same customs as in ancient times.

1998 Temple of the Tooth attack in the palace premises

The 1998 Temple of the Tooth attack was a devastating attack on the Temple of the Tooth Relic, located within the Royal Palace premises in Sri Lanka. This temple is of great importance to the Buddhist community as it houses the relic of the tooth of the Buddha and is also a designated UNESCO World Heritage Site. In 1998, the temple was attacked by the Liberation Tigers of Tamil Eelam (LTTE), resulting in significant damage to the temple's roof and facade. However, the inner chambers and the tooth relic remained unharmed.

The attack also caused severe damage to various parts of the Royal palace, including the Paththirippuwa (the octagon), Mahawahalkada (the grand entrance), the Maha Wasala, sandakada pahana (the moonstone) at the entrance, the queen's bath, and the library of the temple. Additionally, some important sculptures.

Other Royal Palaces
There were several palaces in addition to the main palace in Kandy, including the Hanguranketha Maligawa, Kundasale Maligawa, and Binthanne Maligawa. Kundasale Maligawa was a summer palace and a playful palace that did not carry out any royal official tasks. King Rajasinghe II was born in Binthanne Maligawa. Only Haguranketha Maligawa, originally a summer house for royals built by Rajasinghe II, was later expanded as an additional royal palace that could exercise the royal official tasks in it and serve as a defense palace along with the main palace. It contained an audience hall, a court (Maha Naduwa), and a state hall like the main palace in Kandy.

Unfortunately, none of these palaces exist today as they were all destroyed by British invaders in the 19th century, and no restoration was ever undertaken for these palaces. However, there are foreign accounts that describe these palaces in detail. Famous accounts include Robert Knox's description of the Hanguranketha palace and the palace of Kundasale mentioned in the famous local poem Mandarampuwatha.

References

External links 

Houses in Kandy
Kingdom of Kandy
Museums in Kandy District
Palaces in Sri Lanka